The Whale Cave is a wave-cut platform in Xiaomen Village, Xiyu Township, Penghu County, Taiwan.

History
The wave is originally a basalt cliffed coast. After being continuously eroded by monsoon and seawater, it finally became an arch.

Geology
The cave is located on Xiaomen Island. From the side, the hollow part roughly has the shape of a whale.

See also
 Penghu National Scenic Area

References 

Caves of Taiwan
Landforms of Penghu County
Tourist attractions in Penghu County